The Denel Dynamics (formerly Kentron) MUPSOW (MUlti-Purpose, Stand-Off Weapon) is a guided weapon designed for pinpoint strikes against soft targets such as airfields, bunkers and command-and-control centers at stand-off ranges. Accuracy is achieved by using an advanced  inertial navigation and terminal guidance technology consisting of a data link to either TV, IIR or MMW seekers. The airframe is made out of composites, powered by a turbojet.  The weapon carries warheads of fragmentation, anti-runway ordnance and single warhead configurations.

The Mupsow is a South African development on which Kentron has been working under contract from the Air Force since 1991, with  unpowered flight tests commencing in 1997. The MUPSOW is thought to be an extension of the H2 stand-off weapon program. It is not known if Mupsow has entered SAAF service.

See also
Ra'ad-II, a Pakistani ALCM which possess somewhat similarities in dimensions and appearance

External links 
 Mupsow Cruise Missile
 
 MUPSOW/Torgos
 MUPSOW

Guided missiles of South Africa